The Capt. Gershom Bradford House is an historic house in Duxbury, Massachusetts.  The two-story wood-frame house was built in 1807 by Captain Gershom Bradford.  The main block has a side-gable roof, and is five bays wide and two deep.  A two-story ell attached to the right rear connects the house to another addition, a replacement for a barn torn down c. 1900.  The house is now owned and operated by the Duxbury Rural and Historical Society as a historic house museum, and has been decorated with original Bradford family furnishings to appear as it did during the 1840s.

The house was listed on the National Register of Historic Places in 1978.

See also
National Register of Historic Places listings in Plymouth County, Massachusetts

References

External links
Gershom Bradford House - Duxbury Historical Society

Houses completed in 1807
Historic house museums in Massachusetts
Houses in Duxbury, Massachusetts
Museums in Plymouth County, Massachusetts
National Register of Historic Places in Plymouth County, Massachusetts
Houses on the National Register of Historic Places in Plymouth County, Massachusetts
Federal architecture in Massachusetts